Theodora Hermina van der Meiden-Coolsma (7 November 1918 – 19 June 2001) was a Dutch columnist and the author of children's fiction. She wrote 25 children's books. Seven of these were written together with Coos Covens. Two others were written under the pen name Constance Hazelager.

As the daughter, wife, and sister of Dutch Reformed ministers, and the granddaughter of the missionary Sierk Coolsma, most of her fiction was on Christian topics. Some books were set in Suriname where she had lived during the years 1951–1955. From Suriname, she wrote columns for the daily newspapers Nieuwsblad van het Noorden and the Nieuwe Rotterdamsche Courant.

Dora Coolsma married ds. Jan van der Meiden on 1 July 1940. At the height of his career, he was the minister of the Grote Kerk, Dordrecht. They had four children, among whom the late historian and translator .

Bibliography

References

External links

 Dora van der Meiden-Coolsma at Achterderug.nl
 Constance Hazelager (pen name) at Achterderug.nl
 Dora van der Meiden-Coolsma at Digital Library for Dutch Literature

1918 births
2001 deaths
20th-century Dutch dramatists and playwrights
20th-century Dutch women writers
Dutch columnists
Dutch women dramatists and playwrights
Dutch members of the Dutch Reformed Church
People from Groningen (city)
Protestant writers
Dutch writers of young adult literature
Dutch women columnists
Dutch women children's writers
Women writers of young adult literature
20th-century dramatists and playwrights
20th-century pseudonymous writers
Pseudonymous women writers